Phantasie III: The Wrath of Nikademus is the third video game in the Phantasie series.

Gameplay

The "final" installment of the Phantasie trilogy was based around fighting the evil Nikademus and finishing him for good. Released in 1987, this time Nikademus was attempting to take over the entire world and it was up to the party to stop him.

Phantasie III maintained the style of the original two and improved upon the graphics on all platforms except the DOS version. The combat engine also saw a few upgrades, adding specific wound locations, with characters now able to have their head, torso, or a limb specifically injured, broken, or removed.  It was also now possible to have a more tactical battle line-up, with the ability to move characters to the front, middle, or rear of the party.  The game also improved upon the spell list and added a larger variety of weapons and equipment. The game also had two possible endings depending on whether the characters chose to fight Nikademus or join him.

Reception
Phantasie III sold 46,113 copies. Scorpia was pleased by it improving the trading interface and combat, and by the "grand ending" to the game and the trilogy, but called the game "by far the weakest in the series" and criticized its short length. Phantasie III was reviewed in 1988 in Dragon #130 by Hartley, Patricia, and Kirk Lesser in "The Role of Computers" column. The reviewers gave the game 4 out of 5 stars.

Phantasie I, Phantasie III, and Questron II were later re-released together, and reviewed in 1994 in Dragon #203 by Sandy Petersen in the "Eye of the Monitor" column. Petersen gave the compilation 2 out of 5 stars.

References

External links
Review in Info

1987 video games
Amiga games
Apple II games
Atari ST games
Commodore 64 games
DOS games
Fantasy video games
FM-7 games
MSX2 games
NEC PC-8801 games
NEC PC-9801 games
Role-playing video games
Sharp X1 games
Single-player video games
Strategic Simulations games
Video game sequels
Video games developed in the United States
X68000 games